Omena is a small unincorporated community and census-designated place (CDP) in Leelanau Township of Leelanau County in the U.S. state of Michigan. As of the 2020 census it had a population of 295. Overlooking Omena Bay, on the western side of Grand Traverse Bay, Omena is home to wineries and farms including a thriving organic farming movement that includes cherries and hops. The area has several wineries featuring some of the region's cherry and grape crop, for which the Grand Traverse and Leelanau areas are known. The nearest substantial city is Traverse City,  to the south.

History
In 1852, the Rev. Peter Daugherty relocated an Indian mission from Old Mission on the Old Mission Peninsula across the western arm of the Grand Traverse Bay to what was at first called "New Mission". He (built) a small Presbyterian church there as the nucleus of the community. The church continues an active schedule of services during the summer months.

It was a stop on the Grand Rapids and Indiana Railroad and was regarded as a summer resort area. Among others, Benjamin Grierson, a U.S. Civil War general, had a summer home in Omena, as did General Byron Cutcheon.

Etymology 
Omena is derived from an Ojibwe expression, "o-me-nah", meaning "is it so?"

Geography
Omena is in northeastern Leelanau County on the west side of Grand Traverse Bay, an arm of Lake Michigan. It is served by one state highway, M-22, which leads south  to Traverse City and north  to Northport.

Demographics

Mayoral elections
Omena is an unincorporated community and therefore lacks a centralized official government system. However, the citizens of Omena, Michigan practice triennial elections for a non-human mayor held by the Omena Historical Society. This was inspired by the canine mayoral elections of Rabbit Hash, Kentucky. The current "mayor" of Omena is Rosie Disch, a Golden mixed bread dog. The 2021 election raised $14,000 for the Omena Historical Society. Rosie will be in office for a three year term. Previous mayor's are: Sweet Tart, the first feline mayor elected to the position from 2018; Polly Loveless, a tri-pod dog who died in office after winning the 2015 election; Maya Deibel, a dog who won the 2012 election; and Tucker Joyce, a golden who won the inaugural election in 2009.  https://www.9and10news.com/2021/07/24/local-dog-elected-as-omena-mayor/

See also

 Grove Hill New Mission Church also known as the Omena Presbyterian Church

References

Further reading
Clarke Historical Library, Central, Michigan University, Bibliography for Leelanau County
Powers, Perry F. A history of northern Michigan and its people. Assisted by Harry Gardner Cutler. Chicago: Lewis Publishing Co., 1912. p. 351
Romig, Walter. Michigan Place Names. Detroit: Wayne State University Press, 1986.
Wait, Steven Edwin and Anderson, William S. Old settlers; : a historical and chronological record, together with personal experiences and reminiscences of members of the Old settlers of the Grand Traverse region. Traverse City, Mich.: [Ebner brothers], 1918. p. 18
Wakefield, Lawrence, Ed. "A History of Leelanau Township". Friends of the Leelanau Township Library, 1982. p. 188
Omena Bay Painters, OmenaBayPainters.com

External links

Leelanau Township Library Website
Omena history at the Omena Historical Society
New Mission Organics

Unincorporated communities in Leelanau County, Michigan
Unincorporated communities in Michigan
Census-designated places in Leelanau County, Michigan
Census-designated places in Michigan
Traverse City micropolitan area
Populated places established in 1852
1852 establishments in Michigan